Erinn Anne Bartlett (born February 26, 1973) is an American actress who also competed in the Miss Teen USA pageant.

Early life and education 
Bartlett was born in Longmeadow, Massachusetts. She graduated from Ithaca College with a degree in communication.

Career 
Bartlett first competed in the Miss Massachusetts Teen USA title in 1989, when she placed first runner-up. She went on to win the Miss Massachusetts Teen USA crown in 1991 and represented Massachusetts in the Miss Teen USA 1991 held in Biloxi, Mississippi on August 19, 1991.  Bartlett made it to the top twelve of the nationally televised event, placing sixth in interview, last in swimsuit and tenth in evening gown.  Her average competition score put her in tenth place overall.

She has also appeared in films Shallow Hal (2001), Pumpkin (2002), Raising Helen (2004), Rumor Has It (2005).

Personal life 
Bartlett became engaged to actor Oliver Hudson, son of Goldie Hawn and Bill Hudson, on February 21, 2004 and the two married on June 9, 2006. The ceremony was officiated by a Buddhist monk. In March 2007 it was announced that the couple were expecting their first child. On August 23, 2007, Bartlett gave birth to a boy, Wilder Brooks Hudson. It was announced in October 2009 that the couple were expecting their second child and their son, Bodhi Hawn Hudson, was born on March 19, 2010. Bartlett gave birth to the couple's first daughter, Rio Laura Hudson, on July 18, 2013.

Filmography

Film

Television

References

External links

1973 births
Living people
Actresses from Massachusetts
American film actresses
American television actresses
Ithaca College alumni
20th-century Miss Teen USA delegates
People from Longmeadow, Massachusetts
21st-century American women
1991 beauty pageant contestants